The 1918 Camp Dodge football team was an American football team that represented Camp Dodge near Des Moines, Iowa, during the 1918 college football season. The team, consisting of soldiers stationed at Camp Dodge, compiled a 2–1–1 record.

Schedule

References

Camp Dodge
Camp Dodge football